In mathematics, in particular commutative algebra, the concept of fractional ideal is introduced in the context of integral domains and is particularly fruitful in the study of Dedekind domains. In some sense, fractional ideals of an integral domain are like ideals where denominators are allowed. In contexts where fractional ideals and ordinary ring ideals are both under discussion, the latter are sometimes termed integral ideals for clarity.

Definition and basic results

Let  be an integral domain, and let  be its field of fractions.

A fractional ideal  is called invertible if there is another fractional ideal  such that

where

is called the product of the two fractional ideals).

In this case, the fractional ideal  is uniquely determined and equal to the generalized ideal quotient 

The set of invertible fractional ideals form an abelian group with respect to the above product, where the identity is the unit ideal  itself. The principal fractional ideals form a subgroup. A (nonzero) fractional ideal is invertible if, and only if, it is projective as an -module. Geometrically, this means an invertible fractional ideal can be interpreted as rank 1 vector bundle over the affine scheme .

Dedekind domains

In Dedekind domains, the situation is much simpler. In particular, every non-zero fractional ideal is invertible. In fact, this property characterizes Dedekind domains:
An integral domain is a Dedekind domain if, and only if, every non-zero fractional ideal is invertible.

The set of fractional ideals over a Dedekind domain  is denoted .

Its quotient group of fractional ideals by the subgroup of principal fractional ideals is an important invariant of a Dedekind domain called the ideal class group.

Number fields
The key property of these rings  is they are  Dedekind domains. Hence the theory of fractional ideals can be described for the rings of integers of number fields. In fact, class field theory is the study of such groups of class rings.

Associated structures 
For the ring of integerspg 2  of a number field, the group of fractional ideals forms a group denoted  and the subgroup of principal fractional ideals is denoted . The ideal class group is the group of fractional ideals modulo the principal fractional ideals, so
 
and its class number  is the order of the group . In some ways, the class number is a measure for how "far" the ring of integers  is from being a unique factorization domain. This is because  if and only if  is a UFD.

Exact sequence for ideal class groups 
There is an exact sequence

associated to every number field.

Structure theorem for fractional ideals 
One of the important structure theorems for fractional ideals of a number field states that every fractional ideal  decomposes uniquely up to ordering as

for prime ideals
.

For example,
 factors as 

Hence
 
Another useful structure theorem is that integral fractional ideals are generated by up to 2 elements. We call a fractional ideal which is a subset of  integral.

Examples
  is a fractional ideal over 
 In  we have the factorization . This is because if we multiply it out, we get

Since  satisfies , our factorization makes sense.
 In  we can multiply the fractional ideals
  and
 
to get the ideal

Divisorial ideal
Let  denote the intersection of all principal fractional ideals containing a nonzero fractional ideal .

Equivalently,

where as above
 
If  then I is called divisorial. In other words, a divisorial ideal is a nonzero intersection of some nonempty set of fractional principal ideals.

If I is divisorial and J is a nonzero fractional ideal, then (I : J) is divisorial.

Let R be a local Krull domain (e.g., a Noetherian integrally closed local domain). Then R is a discrete valuation ring if and only if the maximal ideal of R is divisorial.

An integral domain that satisfies the ascending chain conditions on divisorial ideals is called a Mori domain.

See also
Divisorial sheaf
Dedekind-Kummer theorem

Notes

References

 
Chapter 9 of 
Chapter VII.1 of 
Chapter 11 of 

Ideals (ring theory)
Algebraic number theory